Happy Go Lucky (literally Stoves and benches — ironic regional saying that may mean Various subjects for casual conversations or/and Distracting lies depending on the certain context) is a 1972 Soviet comedy film directed by Vasily Shukshin.

Plot 
Story about a travel of married couple from a far-off village in the Altai Mountains to the southern sea. For the first time in life spouses go to the holiday according to the trade-union committee permit moreover in a separate coupe. Road adventures and a rhythm of new life carry them away, but among beauty of the southern nature they can't forget about native places and close people who wait for their return.

Cast 
 Vasily Shukshin as  Ivan Rastorguyev
 Lidiya Fedoseyeva-Shukshina as Nyura Rastorgueva 
 Vsevolod Sanayev as Professor
 Georgi Burkov as Viktor, fake сonstructor, thief
 Zinovy Gerdt as 2nd professor
 Ivan Ryzhov as Train steward
 Stanislav Lyubshin as Ivan Stepanov
 Vadim Zakharchenko as Business traveller

Facts 
 A significant part of the shooting took place in the village of Shulgin Log on the bank of the Katun River. All the shooting took four months.
 The role of Ivan Sergeevich Rastorguev was proposed to Leonid Kuravlyov, but he refused it.

References

External links 

1972 comedy films
1972 films
Soviet comedy films
Films directed by Vasily Shukshin
Rail transport films